Pyridinedicarboxylic acid is a group of organic compounds which are dicarboxylic derivatives of pyridine. Pyridinedicarboxylic acid comes in several isomers:

Quinolinic acid (2,3-pyridinedicarboxylic acid)
Lutidinic acid (2,4-pyridinedicarboxylic acid)
Isocinchomeronic acid (2,5-pyridinedicarboxylic acid)
Dipicolinic acid (2,6-pyridinedicarboxylic acid)
Cinchomeronic acid (3,4-pyridinedicarboxylic acid)
Dinicotinic acid (3,5-pyridinedicarboxylic acid)

All isomers share the molecular weight 167.12 g/mol and the chemical formula C7H5NO4.

Pyridines
Dicarboxylic acids